Raymond Grasset (10 January 1892 - 8 February 1968) was a French politician. He began his career as a physician. He was the Secretary (or Minister) of Family and Health from 18 April 1942 to 20 August 1944.

References

1892 births
1968 deaths
People from Riom
Politicians from Auvergne-Rhône-Alpes
Radical Party (France) politicians
French Ministers of Health
People of Vichy France